Chartered Manager refers to a professional certification in management:
C.Mgr., offered by CIM | Chartered Managers Canada
CMgr, offered by the Chartered Management Institute, U.K.

Professional titles and certifications